Sawnie Robertson Aldredge (November 13, 1890 – May 13, 1949), attorney and judge, was mayor of Dallas from 1921 to 1923.

Biography
Aldredge was born November 13, 1890 in Dallas, Texas, to Judge George Nathan Aldredge and Betty Warren Hearne. He married Mary Ellen Batts, daughter of Judge Robert Lynn Batts and Harriet Fiquet Boak on January 14, 1915 in Austin, Texas. They had two children: Sawnie R. Aldredge, Jr. and Mary Lynn Aldredge. Aldredge's niece, Gertrude Aldredge Shelburne, was an early women's rights and birth control activist in Dallas.

He attended Southwestern University, Cornell University and University of Texas School of Law.  He was admitted to the Texas bar in 1914.  He was associated with Thompson, Knight, Baker & Harris; Allen & Flanary, which eventually became Aldredge, Shults & Madden. During the First World War, he was stationed at Kelly Field, Texas and St. Maixent Field, France.

He ran for mayor with the support of the Citizens' Association, defeating William E. Talbot, nominee of the Democratic party and the Independent Voters' League. Trinity Heights was annexed to the city of Dallas during his administration. This was the largest single addition to the city since Oak Cliff was annexed in 1904.  He sought to annex Highland Park to the city and to establish a municipal golf course. He did not run for a second term.

Sawnie R. Aldredge died May 13, 1949 in Dallas, Texas, and was interred at Hillcrest Mausoleum, Dallas, Texas.

References

Mayors of Dallas
Texas Democrats
Southwestern University alumni
Cornell University alumni
University of Texas School of Law alumni
United States Army personnel of World War I
1890 births
1949 deaths
20th-century American politicians